is a Japanese former professional baseball pitcher. He has played in Nippon Professional Baseball (NPB) for the Yokohama DeNA BayStars and Tohoku Rakuten Golden Eagles.

Career
Yokohama DeNA BayStars selected Kumabara with the second selection in the 2015 NPB draft.

On May 12, 2019, Kumabara made his NPB debut.

On December 2, 2020, he become a free agent. After he announced his retirement.

References

External links

 NPB.com

1993 births
Living people
Baseball people from Miyagi Prefecture
Japanese baseball players
Nippon Professional Baseball pitchers
Yokohama DeNA BayStars players
Tohoku Rakuten Golden Eagles players